Tesla (Thailand) it is a Tesla subsidiary registered in Thailand in April 2022. Initially, the registered capital was THB 3 million, later increased to THB 253 million, with the objective of importing and selling electric car, installed electric storage systems and equipment used with the storage system, installed electricity power generation systems and equipment used in power systems.

There are three members of the Board of Directors: David Jon Feinstein, Waibha Tanecha and Yaron Klein, all of whom are executives of Tesla and have offices located at 87 M Thai Tower, All Seasons Places. David and Waipa are also executives of Tesla Bengaluru branch, India.

References 

Tesla, Inc.